The Jardin ethnobotanique d'Eyne, also called the Jardin de la Vallée, is a botanical garden specializing in ethnobotany. It is located at the Maison de la Vallée, avinguda de Cerdanya, Eyne, Pyrénées-Orientales, Languedoc-Roussillon, France, and is open daily in the warmer months; an admission fee is charged.

Today's garden was created on the site of the farm's earlier vegetable garden. It now contains a representative collection of plants local to the Pyrenees, including trees, flowers, and useful plants, arranged in groupings according to the typical altitude at which the plants grow.

See also 
 List of botanical gardens in France

References 
 BaLaDO.fr description (French)
 Parcs & Jardins entry (French)
 Réseau Culturel entry (French)
 Photograph

Eyne, Jardin ethnobotanique d'
Eyne, Jardin ethnobotanique d'